José "Joseíto" Muñoz (1881 – December 25, 1945) was a Cuban baseball pitcher in the Cuban League and the Negro leagues. He played from 1900 to 1914, mostly for Almendares in the Cuban League and the Cuban Stars (West) in the United States. His 82 wins are fifth on the all-time Cuban League list. In 1940 he was inducted into the Cuban Baseball Hall of Fame.

References

External links

1881 births
1945 deaths
Baseball players from Havana
Cuban League players
Almendares (baseball) players
Cuban Stars (West) players
San Francisco (baseball) players
Club Fé players
Habana players
Carmelita players